News of the World Tournament may refer to:

News of the World Match Play, a golf tournament
News of the World Snooker Tournament, a snooker tournament
News of the World Darts Championship, a darts tournament